Crambus argyrophorus is a moth in the family Crambidae. It was described by Arthur Gardiner Butler in 1878. It is found in Japan.

The wingspan is 18–25 mm.

References

Crambini
Moths described in 1878
Moths of Japan